Omar Brown may refer to:

 Omar Brown (sprinter) (born 1982), Jamaican sprinter
 Omar Brown (defensive back, born 1975), American football player
 Omar Brown (defensive back, born 1988), American football player

See also
List of people with surname Brown